The 2012 CSU–Pueblo ThunderWolves football team represented Colorado State University–Pueblo as a member of the Rocky Mountain Athletic Conference (RMAC) in the 2012 NCAA Division II football season. They were led by fourth-year head coach John Wristen and play their home games at Neta and Eddie DeRose ThunderBowl.

Schedule

Source:

Ranking movements

References

CSU-Pueblo
CSU Pueblo ThunderWolves football seasons
Rocky Mountain Athletic Conference football champion seasons
CSU-Pueblo ThunderWolves football